China competed at the 2012 Winter Youth Olympics in Innsbruck, Austria.

Medalists

Biathlon

China qualified 3 athletes.

Boys

Girls

Cross-country skiing

China qualified 1 athlete.

Girls

Sprint

Curling

China qualified a team.

Roster
Fourth: Wang Jinbo
Third: Yang Ying
Skip: Bai Yang
Lead: Cao Ying

Mixed team

Draw 1

Draw 2

Draw 3

Draw 4

Draw 5

Draw 6

Draw 7

Tiebreaker

Mixed doubles

Round of 32

Round of 16

Figure skating

China qualified 4 athletes.

Boys

Girls

Pairs

Ice hockey

China qualified 2 athletes.

Boys

Girls

Short track

China qualified 4 athletes.

Boys

Girls

Mixed

Ski jumping

China qualified 1 athlete.

Girls

Speed skating

China qualified 4 athletes.

Boys

Girls

See also
China at the 2012 Summer Olympics

References

Winter Youth Olympics
Nations at the 2012 Winter Youth Olympics
China at the Youth Olympics